Agostino Carracci (or Caracci) (16 August 1557 – 22 March 1602) was an Italian painter, printmaker, tapestry designer, and art teacher. He was, together with his brother, Annibale Carracci, and cousin, Ludovico Carracci, one of the founders of the Accademia degli Incamminati (Academy of the Progressives) in Bologna. This teaching academy promoted the Carracci emphasized drawing from life.  It promoted progressive tendencies in art and was a reaction to the Mannerist distortion of anatomy and space. The academy helped propel painters of the School of Bologna to prominence.

Life

Agostino Carracci was born in Bologna as the son of a tailor. He was the elder brother of Annibale Carracci and the cousin of Ludovico Carracci.  He initially trained as a goldsmith.  He later studied painting, first with Prospero Fontana, who had been Lodovico's master, and later with Bartolomeo Passarotti. He traveled to Parma to study the works of Correggio. Accompanied by his brother Annibale, he spent a long time in Venice, where he trained as an engraver under the renowned Cornelis Cort.  Starting from 1574 he worked as a reproductive engraver, copying works of 16th century masters such as Federico Barocci, Tintoretto, Antonio Campi, Veronese and Correggio. He also produced some original prints, including two etchings.

He traveled to Venice (1582, 1587–1589) and Parma (1586–1587). Together with Annibale and Ludovico he worked in Bologna on the fresco cycles in Palazzo Fava (Histories of Jason and Medea, 1584) and Palazzo Magnani (Histories of Romulus, 1590–1592). In 1592 he also painted the Communion of St. Jerome, now in the Pinacoteca di Bologna and considered his masterwork. In 1620, Giovanni Lanfranco, a pupil of the Carracci, famously accused another Carracci student, Domenichino, of plagiarizing this painting. From 1586 is his altarpiece of the Madonna with Child and Saints, in the National Gallery of Parma.  In 1598 Carracci joined his brother Annibale in Rome, to collaborate on the decoration of the Gallery in Palazzo Farnese. From 1598 to 1600 is a triple Portrait, now in Naples, an example of genre painting.  In 1600 he was called to Parma by Duke Ranuccio I Farnese to begin the decoration of the Palazzo del Giardino, but he died before it was finished. His friend the poet Claudio Achillini dedicated to him an epitaph after his death, later published by Carlo Cesare Malvasia in the life of the Carracci.

Agostino's son Antonio Carracci was also a painter, and attempted to compete with his father's Academy.

An engraving by Agostino Carraci after the painting Love in the Golden Age by the 16th-century Flemish painter Paolo Fiammingo was the inspiration for Matisse's Le bonheur de vivre (Joy of Life).

Works
Oil on canvas unless otherwise noted

 1573 – Pietà (Muscarelle Museum of Art, Williamsburg, Virginia)
 1586 – Madonna and Child with Saints (Galleria nazionale di Parma)
 c.1586 – Lamentation or Pietà (Hermitage, St. Petersburg)
 c.1589–1595 – Reciprico Amore (engraving, Baltimore Museum of Art)
 c.1590 – Annunciation (Musée du Louvre, Paris)
 1590–1595 – Portrait of a Woman as Judith (private collection)
 c. 1592–1593 – Assumption (Ss. Salvatore church, Bologna)
 1592–1597 – The Last Communion of Saint Jerome (Pinacoteca Nazionale di Bologna)
 c.1595 – Head of a Faun in a Concave (drawing in roundel, National Gallery of Art, Washington DC)
 1598–1600 – Triple Portrait of Arrigo, Pietro and Amon (National Museum of Capodimonte, Naples)

Fresco collaborations with Annibale and Ludovico
Life of Aeneas (Palazzo Fava, Bologna)
Lives of Jason and Medea (Palazzo Fava, Bologna)
Scenes from the Foundation of Rome (Palazzo Magnani, Bologna)
Life of Hercules (Palazzo Sampieri Talon, Bologna)

Undated
 The Penitent Magdalen (private collection)
 Carracci's erotic work (prints)

See also
 The Carracci

References

External links

1557 births
1602 deaths
16th-century Italian painters
Italian male painters
17th-century Italian painters
Italian Baroque painters
Painters from Bologna
Italian printmakers
Italian erotic artists
Sibling artists
Catholic painters
Catholic decorative artists